Ste. Marie is a village in Jasper County, Illinois, United States, along the Embarras River. The population was 244 at the 2010 census.

Early history

In the early 1800s, some French had become greatly concerned and dismayed by the effects on the Catholic Church from the French Revolution and the attacks by unbelieving philosophers. Some families, including the Picquets, began to consider emigrating in order to establish elsewhere a new social order based on the principles of the Gospel. In 1835, 19-year-old Joseph Picquet was sent to the United States to "spy out the land" and report back to the family. Joseph landed in New York and worked for nine months in a business house in Philadelphia.  In early 1836, Joseph began his exploration of the country.  His travels took him to Pittsburgh; Lima, Ohio; Fort Wayne, Indiana; Indianapolis; Vincennes, Indiana; Vandalia, Illinois; and St. Louis. Instructed to stay away from large cities, he turned eastward and finally decided on the land in Eastern Illinois that is now Ste. Marie, partly because of its proximity to Vincennes, a strong French city with an availability of priests to say Mass. At that time there was not a single house between Newton and Olney. In October 1836 Joseph returned to France and gave a favorable report of the land.

On January 29, 1837, an association of five including Jacques Picquet, Joseph Picquet, Joseph Schifferstein, Charles Hoffman and Joseph Picquet was formed, with the intent of acquiring and developing land in the United States. A contract was written and signed by the members of the association. On June 20, Joseph returned to the United States with the nucleus of a colony, all related by either blood or marriage, 25 in all, on the ship Mogul. Because they were all related, the new settlement was to be named Colonie des Freres or "Colony of Brothers". On July 20, the new immigrants bought a small farm near St. Francisville where they stayed for several months. On October 1, the settlers left St. Francisville and came to begin their new settlement. They boarded with William Price who had a cabin nearby.

Father Stephen Theodore Badin, a Frenchman, came during this time to bless this work of their own hands and celebrate the Holy Sacrifice of the Mass in their presence. Father Badin was the first Catholic priest ordained in the United States. A stone monument fashioned to look like a log cabin stands on the grounds of the University of Notre Dame as a tribute to him. There is also a mosaic on the east porch of the Cathedral of the Immaculate Conception in Washington, D.C. in memory of him.

On October 28, 1837, the settlers gathered on a knoll south of the Embarras River and took formal possession of the land, dedicating the village to the Virgin Mary. The newly acquired land was called Colonie des Freres, or "Colony of Brothers". Eventually the name of the new settlement was changed to "St. Marie", with the name changing in 1892 to the French feminine version of the spelling.

Joseph Picquet made many more trips back to France to bring other family members to the new colony.

Ste. Marie quickly grew and erected its first church, free school, post office and store. It served as a cultural center amidst miles of wilderness.

Geography
Ste. Marie is located in southeastern Jasper County at  (38.931480, −88.025205).

According to the 2010 census, Ste.

Demographics

As of the census of 2000, there were 261 people, 116 households, and 69 families residing in the village. The racial makeup of the village was 100.00% White. Hispanic or Latino of any race were 0.38% of the population.

There were 116 households, out of which 22.4% had children under the age of 18 living with them, 52.6% were married couples living together, 6.0% had a female householder with no husband present, and 40.5% were non-families. 37.1% of all households were made up of individuals, and 28.4% had someone living alone who was 65 years of age or older.  The average household size was 2.25 and the average family size was 2.99.

In the village, the population was spread out, with 23.8% under the age of 18, 6.5% from 18 to 24, 23.8% from 25 to 44, 16.1% from 45 to 64, and 29.9% who were 65 years of age or older.  The median age was 40 years. For every 100 females, there were 74.0 males.  For every 100 females age 18 and over, there were 74.6 males.

The median income for a household in the village was $32,500, and the median income for a family was $37,344. Males had a median income of $24,375 versus $15,833 for females. The per capita income for the village was $14,479.  About 5.6% of families and 6.8% of the population were below the poverty line, including none of those under the age of eighteen and 15.4% of those 65 or over.

Civics 
Churches
St. Mary's of the Assumption Catholic Church
Pilgrim Holiness Church

Government/School
South Eastern Special Education
Ste. Marie Post Office 62459
Ste. Marie Elementary

References

External links
 Ste. Marie Foundation
 St. Mary of the Assumption Catholic Church

Villages in Jasper County, Illinois
Villages in Illinois
Populated places established in 1837
French-American history